The North Carolina Maritime Museum is a system of regional museums within the North Carolina Museum of History, which in turn part of the North Carolina Department of Natural and Cultural Resources. There are several branches of the Maritime Museum located in Beaufort, Southport and Hatteras.

North Carolina Maritime Museum at Beaufort
The Beaufort museum focuses on North Carolina's cultural maritime heritage, coastal environment and natural history.  Exhibit displays include shells from over 100 countries, fish models, shipwrecks, ship equipment, types of watercraft historically used in North Carolina, whaling, oyster catching, waterfowl hunting equipment and duck decoys, and venomous snakes found in North Carolina.  Small aquariums are on display with local marine life.  Another exhibit focuses on the history of the United States Lighthouse Service, United States Life-Saving Service, Revenue Cutter Service, Steamboat Inspection Service, and the United States Coast Guard in North Carolina.

The separate Boat Shed contains a collection of traditional working watercraft.

The Watercraft Center across from the museum is a facility for the repair and conservation of various watercraft, and offers boatbuilding courses.  The Center also features the John S. MacCormack Model Shop, where visitors can learn the art of ship model making.

North Carolina Maritime Museum at Southport
The North Carolina Maritime Museum at Southport focuses on the maritime heritage of the Lower Cape Fear area of southeastern North Carolina.  Exhibits include ship models, nautical instruments, shipwrecks, pirates, American Civil War history, Fort Johnston (North Carolina), commercial and sport fishing, shells and hurricanes.

Graveyard of the Atlantic Museum in Hatteras
Named after a nickname for North Carolina's treacherous coast, the Graveyard of the Atlantic Museum in Hatteras tells the story of the more than 2,000 shipwrecks that lie off the Outer Banks.

Exhibits explore some of the region's major wrecks, including those of the USS Monitor, U-85, USS Huron and Blackbeard's Queen Anne’s Revenge, and highlight the area's culture of SCUBA diving and fishing. Special attention is paid to the tradition of life-saving and the involvement of area residents in the War of 1812, the Civil War, World War I and World War II.

In media
 "Life in a Salt Marsh," a segment of a 1992 episode of the PBS television series Return to the Sea, includes footage of a North Carolina Maritime Museum field trip to a salt marsh.

References

External links

North Carolina Maritime Museum in Beaufort
North Carolina Maritime Museum at Southport
Graveyard of the Atlantic Museum in Hatteras
Harvey W. Smith Watercraft Center
 Return to the Sea Episode 201 "Life in a Salt Marsh" and "Big Sweep" at OceanArchives (Fair use policy for video at OceanArchives)

Maritime museums in North Carolina
Museums in Carteret County, North Carolina
Museums in Brunswick County, North Carolina
Museums in Dare County, North Carolina
Lighthouse museums in North Carolina
Natural history museums in North Carolina